Esther Boise Van Deman (October 1, 1862 – 3 May 1937) was a leading archaeologist of the late 19th and early 20th centuries. She developed techniques that allowed her to estimate the building dates of ancient buildings in Rome.

Life
Esther Boise Van Deman was born in South Salem, Ohio, to Joseph Van Deman and his second wife, Martha Millspaugh. She was the youngest of six children, including two boys by her father's first marriage.

Education and career 

Van Deman entered the University of Michigan in Ann Arbor at the age of 24 in 1886 and received her A.B. in Latin in 1891. From 1889 she worked closely with the new, young Professor Francis Kelsey, who encouraged her to study the cult of the Vestal Virgins. She stayed at Michigan, becoming one of the first women to undertake post-graduate studies there, and received her A.M. in 1891. She then became the first fellow in Latin at Bryn Mawr College, Pennsylvania. Moving to Baltimore she taught Latin at Wellesley College, then Bryn Mawr School. In 1895 she presented a paper, "The Duties of the Vestals" at a conference organised by Kelsey. She commenced studying for her doctorate at the University of Chicago in 1896 and became the first woman to be awarded a PhD in Latin there in 1898; her thesis again focused on the Vestal Virgins. She then taught Latin at Mount Holyoke College from 1898 to 1901

In 1901 Van Deman travelled to Rome, assisted by her mentor Kelsey, to gather further material on the Vestal Virgins. The House of the Vestal Virgins was being excavated at the time and Van Deman regularly observed the dig and examined the finds. She returned to America in 1903 to become an associate professor at Goucher College teaching Latin and classical archaeology. In 1905 she returned to Rome. In 1906 she won a Carnegie Institution fellowship, which allowed her to study with the School of Classical Studies for three years. She was the third woman to have been awarded this fellowship.

From 1910 to 1925 she was an associate of the Carnegie Institution in Washington, D.C. Between 1925 and 1930 she taught Roman archaeology at the University of Michigan.

Her life's work centered around the analysis of building materials to establish a chronology of construction on ancient sites. In 1907, while attending a lecture in the Atrium Vestae in Rome, Van Deman noticed that the bricks blocking up a doorway differed from those of the structure itself and showed that such differences in building materials provided a key to the chronology of ancient structures. The Carnegie Institution published her preliminary findings in The Atrium Vestae (1909). Van Deman extended her research to other kinds of concrete and brick construction and published "Methods of Determining the Date of Roman Concrete Monuments" in The American Journal of Archaeology. Her basic methodology, with few modifications, became standard procedure in Roman archaeology. During her time in Rome up to 1925 she took many photographs of her work to record archaeology.  Van Deman's major work, written after she retired and settled in Rome, was The Building of the Roman Aqueducts (1934). She died in Rome, Italy, on May 3, 1937. She is buried in the Protestant Cemetery in Rome, near the Porta Ostiense.  At the time of her death, Van Deman was at work on a monograph-length study of Roman construction.  Her work was completed and published by Marion Elizabeth Blake (1882–1961).

Van Deman's nephew, Ralph Van Deman Magoffin (1874–1942), published a study of the Italian city of Praeneste. His interest in archaeology may have been sparked by his aunt.

See also
Marion Elizabeth Blake
Louise Fitz Randolph
Rostra

Works 
 "The Value of Vestal Statues as Originals", American Journal of Archaeology 12.3 (July-Sept. 1908) 324-342
 The Atrium Vestae  1909
 The So-Called Flavian Rostra 1909
 "Methods of Determining the Date of Roman Concrete Monuments", American Journal of Archaeology. April–June 1912
 The Porticus of Gaius and Lucius 1913
 "The Sullan Forum", Journal of Roman Studies 1922
 The Sacra Via of Nero 1925
 The Building of the Roman Aqueducts 1934

Notes, citations and sources

Notes

Citations

Sources

External links 
Van Deman on WorldCat
Van Deman Photograph Collection archived at the American Academy in Rome

1862 births
1937 deaths
American archaeologists
Classical archaeologists
American classical scholars
Women classical scholars
Mount Holyoke College faculty
University of Chicago alumni
American women archaeologists
University of Michigan alumni
Classical scholars of the University of Michigan
Burials in the Protestant Cemetery, Rome
American expatriates in Italy
Bryn Mawr School people
American women academics